Gordon Rugby Football Club is a rugby union club based on the North Shore of Sydney.  The club, known as the Gordon Highlanders, plays out of Chatswood Oval and competes in the New South Wales Rugby Union grade competition.

Club information

 Premiership Titles – Shute Shield: 9 (1949, 1952, 1956, 1958, 1976, 1993, 1995, 1998 & 2020)
 Club Championships: 13
 President: Brad Harrison
 1st Grade Head Coach: Brian Melrose
 1st Colts Head Coach: Josh Mitchell
 General Manager Ace Naati
The original Gordon Rugby Football Club was founded in 1927 on Sydney's North Shore, playing in the Metropolitan Junior Competitions and its home games on Roseville Chase Oval. The club was disbanded in 1930 and the following year, many of its players transferred to the newly formed Roseville Junior Rugby Union Football Club, whose home ground was Chatswood Oval. In the 1935 season, the club won the Metropolitan Junior Club Championship, the Kentwell Cup and its second grade, the Bourke Cup.

Following its success the club was admitted to the Grade Competition in 1936 and changed its name to the Gordon District Rugby Union Football Club, fielding four grade and two junior sides, which participated in the Metropolitan Junior Competition.

By 1939, the 1st XV had won the minor premiership but were defeated in the final by the ultimate premiers. Apart from the 4th grade team winning a premiership in 1946, it was 1949 before Gordon won the Club Championship with its 1st and 4th grade teams, with all four teams playing in the semi-finals.

In 1949, the club adopted a new jersey incorporating the colours of the Gordon tartan and its club song “A Gordon For Me”, emphasising the strong Scottish influence within the club.

First grade premierships were achieved in 1949, 1952, 1956, 1958, 1976, 1993, 1995, 1998 and 2020. Over the years, the lower grade sides have played prominently at or near the top of the competition tables with Gordon winning the Club Championship 13 times.

Many Gordon players have earned representative honours playing for the state and Australia – far too many to list here. Trevor Allan, who has won lasting international acclaim, together with Bob Davidson and Peter Sullivan have all captained Australian touring teams. Stirling Mortlock played 80 Tests for the Wallabies and captained for 29 of them. He was a Gordon Junior and Colt.

In addition to the club's attractive style of play it is renowned for its dedication to the promotion of the game at all levels, its tremendous club spirit, its enthusiastic supporters and an excellent and supportive administration.

Under the banner of Gordon Rugby, the Gordon Rugby Football Club Ltd currently fields four grade and three colts sides, plus reserves and representative junior sides from village clubs Chatswood, Hornsby, Killara-West Pymble, Lane Cove, Lindfield, Roseville, St Ives and Wahroonga

For the 2022 season Gordon has appointed Brian Melrose as 1st Grade Head Coach with Andy Connors as 1st Colts Head Coach.

Current squad

The squad for the 2022 season

International representatives

Rugby Championships
 Club Championships: 13 – 1949 1952 1957 1962 1971 1974 1975 1976 1978 1990 1993 1998 2020
 1st Grade Premierships: 9 – 1949, 1952, 1956, 1958, 1976, 1993, 1995, 1998 & 2020.
 1st Grade Runners Up: 1950, 1955, 1957, 1967, 1969, 1972, 1980, 1992 & 2022.
 2nd Grade Premierships: – 1961, 1972, 1974, 1976 & 1981.
 2nd Grade Runners Up: 1950, 1952, 1955, 1962, 1968, 1971, 1975, 1980, 2008 & 2009.
 3rd Grade Premierships: – 12 – 1959, 1960, 1967, 1970, 1972, 1977, 1983, 1993, 2008, 2009, 2019 & 2020.
 3rd Grade Runners Up: – 1948, 1951, 1962, 1966, 1969, 1973, 1974, 1975, 1978, 1981, 1992, 1994, 1999 & 2000.
 4th Grade Premierships: 18 – 1949, 1952, 1953,1955, 1958, 1969, 1970, 1972, 1974, 1975, 1980, 1985, 1991, 1992, 1993, 1999, 2000 & 2007.
 4th Grade Runners Up: – 1950, 1954, 1959, 1960, 1961, 1973, 1977, 1983, 1987 & 2020

Gordon D.R.U.F.C Veterans (World War II) KIA

Club song
(To the tune of the Scottish folk song of the same name)

References

External links
 Gordon RFC home page
 Jack Dempsey & Tom Matthews participate in project
Gordon Stags Rugby Site

Rugby union teams in Sydney
Rugby clubs established in 1936
1936 establishments in Australia
Gordon, New South Wales